Patrick Joseph "Doc" Carney (August 7, 1876 – January 9, 1953) was a professional baseball player. He played all or part of four seasons in Major League Baseball, from 1901 until 1904, for the Boston Beaneaters, primarily as an outfielder. Carney also pitched for the Beaneaters, pitching in 16 games in 1902, 1903 and 1904, compiling a 4–10 record with an ERA of 4.69.

After his major league career, Carney went on to coach baseball at his alma mater, the College of the Holy Cross, from 1906 until 1909. He also became a general practice medical doctor and practiced in Worcester, Massachusetts.

References

External links

1876 births
1953 deaths
19th-century baseball players
Major League Baseball right fielders
Boston Beaneaters players
Worcester Farmers players
Worcester Quakers players
St. Paul Saints (AA) players
Nashville Vols players
Little Rock Travelers players
Holy Cross Crusaders baseball coaches
Sportspeople from Holyoke, Massachusetts
Baseball players from Massachusetts